Rheumaptera is a genus of moths of the family Geometridae erected by Jacob Hübner in 1822.

Selected species

 Rheumaptera acutata D. Y. Xue & F. Meng, 1992
 Rheumaptera affinis D. Y. Xue & F. Meng, 1992
 Rheumaptera caucasica (Müller & Viidalepp)
 Rheumaptera cervinalis (Scopoli, 1763)
 Rheumaptera exacta (Butler, 1882)
 Rheumaptera flavipes Ménétriés, 1858
 Rheumaptera fuegata (Staudinger, 1899)
 Rheumaptera gudarica Dufay, 1983
 Rheumaptera hastata (Linnaeus, 1758)
 Rheumaptera hecate (Butler, 1878)
 Rheumaptera hedemannaria <small>Oberthür, 1880</s</small>
 Rheumaptera hyrcana Staudinger, 1871
 Rheumaptera inanata Christoph, 1880
 Rheumaptera instabilis Alphéraky, 1883
 Rheumaptera ithys (L. B. Prout, 1937)
 Rheumaptera latifasciaria Leech, 1891
 Rheumaptera montivagata (Duponchel, 1830)
 Rheumaptera moscardonica Laever, 1983
 Rheumaptera neocervinalis Inoue, 1982
 Rheumaptera prunivorata Ferguson, 1955
 Rheumaptera ravulata Staudinger, 1892
 Rheumaptera scotaria (Hampson 1907)
 Rheumaptera subhastata (Nolcken, 1870)
 Rheumaptera turkmenica (Müller & Viidalepp)
 Rheumaptera undulata (Linnaeus, 1758)
 Rheumaptera veternata Christoph, 1880

External links

 Rheumaptera on Fauna Europaea
 Rheumaptera  full description Watson, L. & Dallwitz, M. J. (2003 onwards). British Insects: The Genera of Lepidoptera-Geometridae. Version: 29 December 2011

 
Rheumapterini
Taxa named by Jacob Hübner